Hyde School is a private, co-educational, college-preparatory boarding school for grades 9–12 and postgraduate in Bath, Maine, United States. 
It was founded in 1966 by Joseph W. Gauld who wanted to "set up a school devoted to developing self-confidence and self-discipline."

History 
Hyde was founded in 1966 by Joe Gauld, who had previously worked for 13 years in public and private schools. Concerned by "sentimentalist attitude[s]" about child-raising, he discerned that "society is blind to the reality that teens need to face and overcome difficult challenges if they are to become confident, productive, fulfilled adults." He was inspired to create a curriculum focused on "development of character and a deeper sense of purpose" than just achieving good grades, going to a good college, and having a good job. He first took this vision to Berwick Academy when he was appointed headmaster there. Gauld recounts how conflicts with the trustees about his educational innovations led to his resignation, although one reporter writes that he was fired.

Gauld went on to establish the Hyde School at Elmhurst (commonly known as the Hyde Mansion), formerly the estate of "John Sedgewick Hyde, the son of Bath Iron Works (BIW) founder Thomas W. Hyde". Loans from friends and family, as well as "donations from the three heirs of the Hyde family", funded its purchase. The site included the Hyde Mansion with its indoor swimming pool, an educational wing built by the interim owners, the Pine Tree Society for Crippled Children and Adults, and 145 acres of land. The school is named after the Hyde family, the original owners.

Opened as a school for boys, Hyde went co-ed in 1971. Initial expansion plans began in the 1970s, with the school considering sites in the Midwest. In the 1990s, the school was also considering a "satellite school" on the West Coast, since a quarter of the student body at the time was from California. When a site became available in Woodstock, Connecticut in 1996, a second campus, known as Hyde-Woodstock, was opened on the campus of the former Annhurst College. In 1996, Hyde also purchased "a 700-acre tract of western maine woodland" in Eustis, ME, that is used as its wilderness campus.

Hyde has had some impact in the public school sector. Hyde ran a charter school in Washington, D.C. from 1999 to 2011. It currently has a K-12 charter school in the Bronx (Hyde Leadership Charter High School) and a K-6 charter school in Brooklyn (Hyde Leadership Charter School).

By 2016, like other boarding schools, both the Bath and Woodstock campuses were facing declining enrollment. It was announced in January 2017 that the 127-acre Woodstock campus would be closed and sold to nearby Woodstock Academy for $14.25 million (USD). The consolidation of the two campuses moved Woodstock students and many faculty to Bath, allowed for an expansion of the curriculum and student financial aid, as well as leading to plans to renovate some of the facilities.

Educational model

Mission 
The mission of Hyde is to build character and "reach students that nobody has been able to reach before" due to behavioral problems. Due to this, the school focuses on character education, leadership development, and developing student potential. Applicants' academic transcripts are not evaluated as part of the admission process; instead, students and their families take a two-hour interview.

Student Body 

A 1994 government report listed Hyde as one of the schools the "acknowledge that youths' problem behaviors are often related to family problems and disfunction" and asserted that "[m]ost of Hyde's students have a history of family problems." The "[p]rimary reasons for referral are rebelliousness, lack of respect for authority, and poor performance in school." This 1994 report also said, [a]bout 10 percent of the students have been in drug rehabilitation programs.In 2004 in an article for Strugglingteens.com, one set of parents wrote that they observed that "students had psychiatric diagnoses, such as"depression, bipolar disorder, ADHD, PTSD, and eating disorders."

Curriculum 

As part of the character-building curriculum, all students are required to participate in academics, performing arts, athletics, and community service. Hyde students evaluate themselves against the school's five principles of Courage, Integrity, Leadership, Curiosity, and Concern. Regular visits from parents are required; they also participate in regional groups away from campus. Honors and Advanced Placement courses are offered, though graduation is based on personal development more than academics, with individual degrees being determined by community assessment.

Discipline and Corporal Punishment 

Strict behavioral rules are enacted and enforced by administrators and the community at Hyde. Students can stop classes and call "concern meetings" to challenge peers they feel are underprepared. Examples of past disciplinary procedures include corporal punishment such as slapping and public paddling, a student being thrown in a duck pond, a student being ordered to box a teacher, labor on the school grounds and nearby farms, living in isolation, digging a pit as a metaphorical grave, and receiving a masculine haircut.

In 2010, the Woodstock campus experimented with banning the use of technology on Tuesdays, in attempt to increase face-to-face communication.

Hyde runs a leadership program in July for students ages 13–18. The program takes place on the Bath, Maine campus and on Hyde's Black Wilderness Preserve in Eustis, Maine.

Publications
 Gauld, Joseph W. The Courage to Grow, The Hyde School, 1975.
Gauld Joseph W. Character First: The Hyde School Difference, The Hyde School Foundation, 1993. 
 Gauld, Malcolm & Laura Gauld. The Biggest Job We'll Ever Have: The Hyde School Program for Character-Based Education and Parenting, Scribner, 2003. 
 Gauld, Joseph W. Nature's Parenting Process: 5 Simple Truths to Empower Our Children, The Hyde Foundation, 2010. 
 Gauld, Malcolm. College Success Guaranteed: 5 Rules to Make It Happen, R&L Education, 2011. 
 Gauld, Joseph W. What Kids Want and Need From Parents: How to Bond with and Mentor Children, Argo-Navis, 2012.
Gauld, Joseph W. Hyde: Preparation for Life, The Hyde Foundation, 2012.

References

External links 
 
 Parenting: The Biggest Job
 Niche.com

Woodstock, Connecticut
Buildings and structures in Bath, Maine
Schools in Sagadahoc County, Maine
Private high schools in Maine
Private high schools in Connecticut
Boarding schools in Maine
Educational institutions established in 1966
1966 establishments in Maine